The 2013 Antrim Senior Hurling Championship was the 113th staging of the Antrim Senior Hurling Championship since its establishment in 1901. The championship began on 4 August 2013 and is ended on 29 September 2013.

Loughgiel Shamrocks were the reigning champions, and successfully defended their title following a 3-14 to 2-6 defeat of Ruairí Óg, Cushendall.

Results

Round 1

Quarter-finals

Semi-finals

Final

External links
 2013 Antrim Senior Hurling Championship results

References

Antrim Senior Hurling Championship
Antrim Senior Hurling Championship